Jumbo was a 19th-century circus elephant.

Jumbo may also refer to:

Arts, entertainment and media

Music
 Jumbo (musical), a 1935 play about a circus
 Jumbo (band), a Mexican rock band
 "Jumbo" (Underworld song)
 "Jumbo" (Bee Gees song)

Fictional characters
 Mrs. Jumbo, a character in Dumbo
 Jumbo Carnation, a character in the Marvel Comics Universe
 General Jumbo, a UK comic-strip character
 Takashi Takeda or Jumbo, a character in Yotsuba&!

Other arts, entertainment and media
 Jumbo (2008 film), an Indian animated film
 Jumbo (2020 film), a drama film
 Jumbo (magazine), a defunct Italian comic magazine

Businesses
 Jumbo (supermarket), a Dutch supermarket chain
 Jumbo (hypermarkets), a Chilean hypermarket
 Jumbo Video, a chain of video stores in Canada
 Jumbo Games, a European maker of games and puzzles
 Jumbo S.A., a Greek toy company
 Jumbo Shopping Centre, Vantaa, Finland
 Jumbo Records, a record label in Britain  1908–1918
 Jumbo Kingdom, floating restaurants in Hong Kong; closed in 2022

Places

United States
 Jumbo, Alabama, an unincorporated community
 Jumbo, Arkansas, an unincorporated community
 Jumbo, Kentucky, an unincorporated community
 Jumbo, Ohio, an unincorporated community
 Jumbo, Oklahoma, an unincorporated community
 Jumbo, West Virginia, an unincorporated community
 Jumbo Mountain, a mountain in Washington State
 Jumbo Peak (Washington), a mountain in Washington State

Elsewhere
 Jumbo Glacier, British Columbia, Canada, aka Jumbo, a mountain resort municipality
 Jumbo Mountain (Canada), Purcell Mountains, Canada
 Jumbo Peak, in the Tararua Range, New Zealand
 Jumbo, Zimbabwe, a village
 Jumbo Cove, South Georgia Island

Sports
 Jumbo formation, an offensive formation in American football
 Tufts Jumbos, the varsity intercollegiate athletic programs of Tufts University
 Jumbo the Elephant, the official mascot of Tufts University

Transportation
 Jumbo-class ferry, consisting of two ferries built by Washington State Ferries in 1972
 Boeing 747, aircraft manufactured by Boeing informally known as "Jumbo"
 Werkspoor Jumbo, a 1930s Dutch freighter biplane
 Glasflügel 604, a glider nicknamed "Jumbo" for its large size
 New South Wales 442 class locomotive, nicknamed "Jumbos" by railway enthusiasts
 Jumbo, a type of auto rickshaw in Laos
 Jumbo, name given to the only NZR WJ class steam locomotive

People
 Jumbo (nickname)
 Cush Jumbo (born 1985), English actress and writer
 Oko Jumbo (died 1891), Nigerian traditional ruler
 Jumbo Tsuruta, ring name of Japanese professional wrestler Tomomi Tsuruta (1951–2000)
 Jumbo (actor), stage name of Dhallywood actor Babul Gomes (1944–2004)

Other uses
 M4A3E2 Assault Tank or Jumbo, a variant of the US M4 Sherman tank
 "Jumbo", code-name of a steel canister constructed for the Trinity nuclear test
 Drilling jumbo, rock drilling machine used in underground mining and tunnelling
 Jumbo Water Tower, Colchester, England
 Jumbo frame, an Ethernet frame with more than 1500 bytes of payload
 Jumbo, a muscadine cultivar

See also
 Mumbo jumbo (phrase), gibberish or a meaningless ritual
 Jumbo mortgage (United States), a mortgage loan in an amount above conventional conforming loan limits
 Airbus A380, "Super Jumbo", specifically
 Jumbo jet (disambiguation)